Soul Lady (lit. "Seoul Lady") is the debut studio album by Japanese musician Yukika Teramoto, released on July 21, 2020 by Estimate Entertainment and distributed by Dreamus. The album contains 13 tracks, including the lead single of the same name.

Track listing 
Credits adapted from Melon and Naver.

Notes:
 While "Neon" is the fourth track and considered part of the EP, it is not available as part of it on either iTunes or Korean services like Melon because of difference of the distributor company.
 "I Feel Love", "Neon", "Soul Lady", "Shade", and "Neon 1989" is stylized in all uppercase.
 "Pit-a-pet" is stylized in all lowercase.

Accolades

Personnel 
Credits adapted from Melon and Naver.

Recording locations
 Recorded at ESTIMATE Studio, MonoTree Studio, OREO Studio, Velvet Studio (brass recording)
 Edited at ESTIMATE Studio, MonoTree Studio
 Mixed at ClearFX, ESTIMATE Studio, KLANG STUDIO, MonoTree Studio, PRISMFILTER Mix Lab, RCAVE Sound
 Mastered at 821 Sound Mastering, GLAB Studios, Honey Butter Studio

Personnel

 Park Jin-baeexecutive producer, creative director
 ESTiproducer, scenario directing , keyboard , recording , digital editing , mixing engineer 
 Chu Dae-kwanvocal directing , bass , brass , recording , digital editing , mixing engineer 
 MosPickvocal directing 
 Choi Young-kyoungvocal directing , background vocals , additional topline , digital editing 
 GDLOvocal directing , guitar , keyboard , bass , recording , digital editing 
 Iggyvocal directing , guitar , bass 
 C-novocal directing , keyboard , bass 
 Woong Kimvocal directing , keyboard 
 Son Go-eunvocal directing , keyboard , digital editing 
 TAKvocal directing , keyboard , mixing engineer 
 Yukika Teramotovocals, narration 
 Kim Ha-neulnarration 
 Jeon Jae-heebackground vocals 
 Kim So-hyeonbackground vocals 
 Jang Hye-jibackground vocals 
 Yu Young-jinbackground vocals 
 JAM STRINGstrings 
 Benicxstrings 
 Son Young-jinkeyboard 
 seibinkeyboard , guitar , bass 
 9rotakeyboard , mixing engineer 
 Kim Dong-minguitar 
 Ferdyguitar 
 Yun Seong-hoguitar 
 Park Ki-taeguitar 
 Jukjaeguitar 
 Jun Pipiano 
 Kim Byoung-seokbass 
 Ju Hyeon-woobrass , saxophone 
 Yu Seung-cheoltrumpet 
 Park Kyoung-geontrombone 
 Park Ki-hoflute 
 Oreorecording 
 Lee Sang-deokstrings recording 
 Jeong Ki-hongbrass recording 
 Choi Da-inbrass recording assistant 
 Lee Chan-mibrass recording assistant 
 NOPARIdigital editing 
 Koo Jong-pilmixing engineer 
 Lee Tae-seobmixing engineer 
 Park Cheol-geunmixing engineer 
 Noah Taylormixing engineer 
 Kwon Nam-woomastering 
 Park Jeong-eonmastering 
 bk!mastering 
 Kwak Seung-kyuartist management
 Lee Dae-hyeonmanagement director
 Rproject supervisor
 Digipedimusic video
 Seong Won-modirector
 Moon Seok-hodirector
 Lee Mun-youngproducer
 Jeong Gi-yeolproducer
 Kim Eui-kwandirector of photography, photography
 ACSgaffing
 Kim Dong-min (Born Black)choreography
 Lee Bo-min (Born Black)choreography
 Kim Yun-young (Jungsaemmul Beauty)hair and make-up
 Park Eun-jeong (Jungsaemmul Beauty)hair and make-up
 Seung Seon-ahstylist

Charts

Release history

References 

2020 debut albums
Yukika Teramoto albums
Korean-language albums